Mameh Kandi (also Romanized as Mameh Kandī; also known as Ma‘eh Kandī) is a village in Ajorluy-ye Sharqi Rural District, Baruq District, Miandoab County, West Azerbaijan Province, Iran.

History 
At the 2006 census, its population was 81, in 16 families.

References 

Populated places in Miandoab County